Mad Max is an Australian post-apocalyptic action film series and media franchise created by George Miller and Byron Kennedy. It began in 1979 with Mad Max, and was followed by three sequels: Mad Max 2 (1981, released in the United States as The Road Warrior), Mad Max Beyond Thunderdome (1985) and Mad Max: Fury Road (2015); Miller directed or co-directed all four films. Mel Gibson portrayed the titular character Max Rockatansky in the first three films, while Tom Hardy portrayed the character in Mad Max: Fury Road.

The series follows the adventures of Rockatansky, a police officer in a future Australia which is experiencing societal collapse due to war and critical resource shortages. When his wife and child are murdered by a vicious biker gang, Max kills them in revenge and becomes a drifting loner in the Wasteland. As Australia devolves further into barbarity, Max finds himself helping pockets of civilisation, initially for his own self-interest, but his motives always drift into more altruistic ones.

The series has been well received by critics, with each film marked "Certified Fresh" on the film review aggregation website Rotten Tomatoes; Mad Max 2 and Fury Road in particular have been ranked among the best action films ever made. The series has also had a significant influence on popular culture, most notably apocalyptic and post-apocalyptic fiction, and encompasses works in additional media, including video games and comic books. In 2016, Fury Road became the first film of the Mad Max franchise to receive Academy Award recognition, winning six of its ten nominations.

North American rights to the original film are currently owned by Amazon's Metro-Goldwyn-Mayer (via the libraries of Orion Pictures and American International Pictures).

Films

Mad Max (1979) 

Mad Max is a 1979 Australian action film directed by George Miller. Written by Miller and James McCausland from a story by Miller and producer Byron Kennedy, set "a few years from now". It tells a story of societal breakdown, murder, and revenge. The film, starring the then little-known Mel Gibson, was released internationally in 1980. It became a top-grossing Australian film, while holding the record in the Guinness Book of Records for decades as the most profitable film ever created, and has been credited for further opening the global market to Australian New Wave films.

Mad Max 2 (1981) 

Mad Max 2 (released as The Road Warrior in the United States) is a 1981 Australian post-apocalyptic action film directed by George Miller. This sequel to Miller's Mad Max was a worldwide box office success that further boosted the career of Mel Gibson. The film's tale of a community of settlers that moved to defend themselves against a roving band of marauders follows an archetypal "Western" frontier movie motif, as does Max's role as a hardened man who rediscovers his humanity. It also opens with a previously unexplained backstory on the tragic events that led to those in the original film.

Mad Max Beyond Thunderdome (1985) 

Mad Max Beyond Thunderdome is a 1985 film, the third installment in the franchise. The film was directed by George Miller and George Ogilvie, and starred Mel Gibson and Tina Turner. The original music score was composed by Maurice Jarre. While Miller initially lost interest in the project after his friend and producer Byron Kennedy was killed in a helicopter crash, he later agreed to move forward with the assistance of Ogilvie.

Mad Max: Fury Road (2015) 

Mad Max: Fury Road, the fourth film of the franchise, is a 2015 post-apocalyptic action film co-written and directed by George Miller. While location scouting was reported to be underway in May 2009, production was delayed until June 2012 due to unusually high levels of rain in the Australian desert which detracted from the post-apocalyptic feeling that Miller wanted. Shooting ultimately took place in Namibia the following year. The film was released on 15 May 2015. It features British actor Tom Hardy as Mad Max and Charlize Theron as Imperator Furiosa. Gibson was originally attached to star in Fury Road during its failed 2003 production attempt.

Furiosa (2024) 

Miller and McCarthy found during the writing process for Mad Max: Fury Road that they had enough story material for two additional scripts. In March 2020, it was announced that a spin-off film centered around Furiosa was in development with auditions via Skype, including Anya Taylor-Joy. By May of the same year, the untitled prequel centered around Furiosa, was confirmed to be in active development. Miller explained that extensive backstories were created for the characters in Fury Road, and that with Furiosa an entire script was written. The filmmaker announced that the primary character will be recast. Though he had originally wanted to digitally de-age Theron to reprise the role, he decided against this after seeing The Irishman and deciding that technology has not yet overcome the uncanny valley. Colin Gibson and John Seale will return as production designer and cinematographer, respectively. Chris Hemsworth and Tom Burke will also star in unspecified roles. Filming began in June 2022 for a release date of May 24, 2024. Filming officially wrapped on October 28, 2022.

Mad Max: The Wasteland (TBA) 
In March 2015, Hardy revealed that he was attached to star in three more Mad Max films, following Fury Road. After the release of Fury Road, Miller announced that a sequel is in development, with the working title of Mad Max: The Wasteland. By January 2016, and after misleading reports which stated that the franchise was over, Miller re-affirmed that he is working on follow up movies. In July 2019, a question regarding unpaid earnings had to be resolved before moving forward with production which was resolved.

Cast and crew

Cast 

The series' protagonist, Max Rockatansky, was portrayed through the first three films by Mel Gibson. Tom Hardy took over the role for 2015's Fury Road. The series features a few recurring cast members in different roles. Bruce Spence played different aviators in two of the films, first the Gyro Captain in Mad Max 2 and then Jedediah the Pilot in Mad Max Beyond Thunderdome. Hugh Keays-Byrne has taken antagonist roles twice: he played Toecutter in Mad Max and Immortan Joe in Mad Max: Fury Road. Max Fairchild appeared as Benno Swaisey in Mad Max and as "Broken Victim" of the Humungus's gang in Mad Max 2.

Additional crew and production details

Reception

Box office performance

Critical and public response 

Audiences surveyed by CinemaScore gave Mad Max: Fury Road a grade "B+" on scale of A to F.

Music

Soundtracks

Tina Turner songs from Beyond Thunderdome 
 "We Don't Need Another Hero (Thunderdome)"
 "One of the Living"

Other media

Merchandising 
Many licensed products are based on the Mad Max franchise. Products include novels, comic books, video games, and other materials.

Novels 
Novelizations of the first three films have also been published by QB Books. The first two novelisations were written by Terry Hayes, who ended up co-writing the script for the second film after getting along well with Miller. A novelisation for the third film was written by Joan D. Vinge.

Video games 

Mad Max is a 1990 video game for the NES developed and published by Mindscape Inc. It is based on the film Mad Max 2. The object of the game is to survive life in the post-apocalyptic world by battling survivalists and collecting resources. Mindscape did develop another Mad Max game originally titled The Road Warrior for SNES and Sega Genesis, but due to Mindscape losing the license before completion they changed the title to Outlander to avoid legal issues. Outlander was released in 1992 for Sega Genesis and SNES.

In September 2015, a game developed by Avalanche Studios based on the setting of Mad Max was released for Linux, OS X, PlayStation 4, Microsoft Windows and Xbox One. The titular character was voiced by Bren Foster.

Comic books 

Mad Max: Fury Road is a limited comic book series created by George Miller, Nico Lathouris, and Mark Sexton. Serving as a prequel to the 2015 film of the same name, the series focuses on several of the film's characters. It consists of four issues. Beginning in May 2015, Vertigo published one issue per month, ending in August. A single-volume collection of all of the issues was published on 26 August. Reception of the series has been mixed; some consider it unnecessary and poorly executed, and many harshly criticised the issue centred on Imperator Furiosa. However, the issue focused on Nux and Immortan Joe and the two issues focused on Max Rockatansky were received more positively.

Other appearances 
 The trailer for the 2021 film Space Jam: A New Legacy revealed the film's inclusion of Mad Max characters among other Warner Bros characters in crowd scenes. In the actual film, in addition to characters being spectators, Wile E. Coyote and the Road Runner appear in the Mad Max world doing their classic chase with Wile E. as a War Boy, before Bugs Bunny and LeBron James show up to get them both. Footage from Fury Road is featured with the duo edited into it.

See also 
 Legacy and influence in popular culture

References 

 
Warner Bros. Pictures franchises
Action film franchises
Mass media franchises introduced in 1979
Post-apocalyptic fiction
Science fiction film franchises
Australian film series
Australian action adventure films
1970s English-language films
1980s English-language films
2010s English-language films